The Netball League of South Africa (known for sponsorship purposes as the Telkom Netball League) is the leading semi-professional netball league in South Africa.

History

On April 16, 2014, Netball South Africa announced that the first semi-professional netball league ever to play in Africa would be launched. Juicing company Brutal Fruit (subsidiary of South African Breweries) were signed as the league's naming-rights sponsor for five years, ensuring the competition would be known as the Brutal Fruit Netball Cup. Ahead of the 2019 competition the sponsorship deal expired and the league was sponsored by Telkom. The inaugural championship was contested by 10 teams from all nine South African provinces, played over a five-week period. The top five provincial teams formed Division 1, with the remainder forming Division 2. The first competition ran from May 10, 2014 to June 7, 2014. All matches were held in the Rembrandt Hall at the University of Pretoria and were broadcast live on SuperSport.

The Free State Crinums won the inaugural Brutal Fruit Netball Cup, beating the Gauteng Jaguars 40-36 in a match that went into overtime. Western Cape's Southern Stings won the Division 2 Shield of the Brutal Fruit Netball Netball in its inaugural year, beating KZN Kingdom Stars 39-31 in the final match.

In 2019 the league consisted of 10 teams split into two divisions. Three other teams whose results were not included were added; the Presidents Smileys, a team made up of national team players based in South Africa, the President’s Stars which is a male only team, competing only in exhibition matches and the Zimbabwe national team used the league as preparation for the World Cup. The 2019 championship was won by the Gauteng Jaguars, their third title in the competition.

In 2020 the league expanded to 12 teams, split into two divisions of six. At the end of the season a promotion and relegation playoff match between the bottom team from Division 1 and the top team Division 2 is played. The 2020 season was won by the Jaguars.

Teams and rules
All matches in the league are played according to prevailing International Netball Federation (INF) rules. Points are awarded as follows:

 Win = 2 points
 Draw = 1 point
 Lose = 0 points

The duration of each match is one hour, consisting of four quarters of 15 minutes each.

Current teams
 Correct as of 2020 season

List of Division A winners
 2020: Gauteng Jaguars
 2019: Gauteng Jaguars
 2018: Gauteng Jaguars
 2017: Gauteng Jaguars
 2016: Free State Crinums 
 2015: Free State Crinums
 2014: Free State Crinums

References

External links
 Official Website

Netball competitions in South Africa
South Africa
2014 establishments in South Africa
Sports leagues established in 2014
Sports leagues in South Africa